Washington Township is one of the eleven townships of Lucas County, Ohio, United States. The 2010 census found 3,278 people in the township.

Communities
The Raintree Mobile Home Village is located in Alexis Addition. The Township hall is located in Alexis Addition. 

Geography
Most of what was once Washington Township is now incorporated, leaving only two small pieces. Those pieces have the following borders:
Western piece: completely surrounded by Toledo
Eastern piece: surrounded by Toledo, except for a border on Erie Township, Monroe County, Michigan in the north
A small part of Maumee Bay is also included in Washington Township.

No municipalities are located in Washington Township.

Name and history
It is one of forty-three Washington Townships statewide.

Washington Township was organized in 1840.

Government
The township is governed by a three-member board of trustees, who are elected in November of odd-numbered years to a four-year term beginning on the following January 1. Two are elected in the year after the presidential election and one is elected in the year before it. There is also an elected township fiscal officer, who serves a four-year term beginning on April 1 of the year after the election, which is held in November of the year before the presidential election. Vacancies in the fiscal officership or on the board of trustees are filled by the remaining trustees.

References

External links
Township website
County website

Townships in Lucas County, Ohio
Townships in Ohio